Hunnisett is a surname. Notable people with the surname include:

Abbie Hunnisett (born 1995), British parasport athlete 
Edwin Edward Hunnisett (1896–1918), British aviator